St. Paul's Episcopal Church is an historic Episcopal church in Richmond, Virginia, United States. Located directly across the street from the Virginia State Capitol, it has long been a popular house of worship for political figures, including General Robert E. Lee and Confederate President Jefferson Davis (earning it the nickname "the Cathedral of the Confederacy"). Davis was a member.

Other notable people associated with the church are Rev. Dr. Charles Minnigerode, who led the church during the Civil War and Reconstruction eras. The Right. Rev. John Shelby Spong, now retired as bishop of the Diocese of Newark, began to attract national attention while rector of St. Paul's (1969–1976).

St. Paul's was built in 1845 as a branch of the Monumental Church, which had outgrown its building. The Greek Revival church was designed by Thomas Somerville Stewart and modeled largely on St. Luke's Church, now Church of St. Luke & the Epiphany, in Philadelphia. It was listed on the National Register of Historic Places in 1969 as St. Paul's Church.

The corner stone was laid on 10-Oct-1843 according to the St. Paul's History book. Consecration was 11-Nov-1845.

The same book estimates the probable cost, before construction, as "not exceeding $53,500".  That excludes the organ and lot.  Later an approximation of $55,000 is given.  Organ is estimated at $4,000 and lot was $6,000 and then an additional lot was added for $1,075.  The book also reports that there were 804 sittings in the nave and 358 in the gallery for a total of 1162.

References

External links
 
Official website
Pod Cast of Church Events - iTunes
Pod Cast of Church Events - Google Play

19th-century Episcopal church buildings
1845 establishments in Virginia
Churches completed in 1845
Saint Paul's Episcopal Church, Richmond, Virginia
Saint Paul's Episcopal Church, Richmond, Virginia
National Register of Historic Places in Richmond, Virginia
Churches on the National Register of Historic Places in Virginia
Religious organizations established in 1845